Guillermo Sepúlveda Rodríguez (29 November 1934 – 19 May 2021) was a Mexican professional footballer who played as a defender for Mexico in the 1958 and 1962 FIFA World Cups. At club level, he spent most of his career with Guadalajara.

Sepúlveda died aged 87 on 19 May 2021.

References

External links
 FIFA profile

1934 births
2021 deaths
Mexican footballers
Association football midfielders
Mexico international footballers
1958 FIFA World Cup players
1962 FIFA World Cup players
CONCACAF Championship-winning players
Footballers from Guadalajara, Jalisco
C.D. Guadalajara footballers
Liga MX players